Chote Praepan (15 May 1907 – 5 April 1956), known by his pen name Jacob, was a Thai writer. His most famous work is Phu Chana Sip Thit (The Man Who Gained Victory in Ten Directions). He died of tuberculosis in 1956.  In 2018 Google ran a Google Doodle in his honor.

References 

Chote Praepan
1907 births
1956 deaths